Kerala Congress (Anti-merger Group) was a faction of Kerala Congress led by Skaria Thomas in Kerala. Kerala Congress (Anti-merger Group) was formerly a part of Left Democratic Front (LDF).

History
In April 2010 the Kerala Congress (M)  and Kerala Congress (J) led by P. J. Joseph decided to merge. But P. C. Thomas opposed the merger. Both P. J. Joseph and P. C. Thomas claimed the party symbol of a bicycle and the party name of Kerala Congress. Registration of Kerala Congress has been frozen by the Election Commission. The case is under review. The P. C. Thomas faction is known as the Kerala Congress (Anti-merger Group) with a chair for its symbol.

2011 State assembly elections

It participated in 2011 elections as a part of LDF. The Party was assigned three seats to contest but was unable to win.

The party enjoys a strong presence in southern Kerala and is active in that region.

Split in Kerala Congress (Anti-merger Group)
In 2015, Kerala Congress (Anti-merger Group) is split into 2 parties
Kerala Congress (Skaria Thomas)
Kerala Congress (Thomas)

Leaders in Skaria Thomas faction
Skariah Thomas
V. Surendran Pillai
Thomas Kunnapally
Jerry Easow Oommen

Leaders in P. C. Thomas faction
P. C. Thomas
Rajan  Kannattu

References

Political parties in Kerala
Kerala Congress Parties
2010 establishments in Kerala
2015 disestablishments in India
Political parties established in 2010
Political parties disestablished in 2015